The men's individual was a golf event held as part of the Golf at the 1904 Summer Olympics programme. It was the second time the event was held at the Olympics, though it took a much different format than the 1900 golf tournament. 75 golfers from two nations competed. The competition was held approximately 5.75 km north of the Olympic Stadium at Glen Echo Country Club from September 19 to September 24, 1904. The event was won by George Lyon of Canada, one of three golfers not from the host United States. Lyon defeated American Chandler Egan in the final, giving Egan the silver medal. Americans Burt McKinnie and Francis Newton were the defeated semifinalists, each receiving bronze.

Background
The first Olympic golf tournaments were held at the 1900 Games, with events for both men and women. One of the men's players was Albert Bond Lambert, who finished eighth in the (Olympic) men's tournament and first in the (non-Olympic) handicap tournament. Lambert and his father-in-law George McGrew, prominent businessmen in the St. Louis area, determined to bring golf to the 1904 Games that would be held in St. Louis. They founded the Glen Echo Country Club and pressed for the inclusion of golf on the programme with a tournament to be held at Glen Echo. The result was the second Olympic golf tournament, though the women's individual event was dropped and a men's team event added.

Golf was later planned to be on the programme for the 1908 Games in London, but a dispute among the British golfers led to them all boycotting. With only the Canadian defending champion Lyon scheduled to compete (and him unwilling to accept a gold medal by walkover), the 1908 golf event was cancelled. Golf would not be held again at the Olympics until 2016.

Canada made its debut in the event. The United States made its second appearance, the only nation to have golfers at both of the first two men's individual golf tournaments.

Competition format
The format for the 1904 men's individual tournament was a grueling one. In contrast to the 1900 Games, which used a 36-hole stroke play tournament as the entire competition, the 1904 tournament started with a 36-hole stroke play qualifying round. This was followed by the top 32 qualifiers playing a 5-round match play tournament with each round consisting of 36 holes. Each round was played on consecutive days, resulting in the finalists playing six straight days of 36 holes of golf. No bronze medal match was played; both semifinal losers received bronze medals.

Schedule

Results

Qualifying round

Golfers played two 18-hole rounds in qualifying play on September 19. The top 32 golfers advanced to match play.

Match play

References

Sources

Golf at the 1904 Summer Olympics